Eugene Russell Smith (November 11, 1895 - June 13, 1948) was a professional football player during the early years of the National Football League with the Chicago Staleys/Bears, Canton Bulldogs, Milwaukee Badgers, Cleveland Bulldogs, Detroit Panthers and Hammond Pros. Smith won NFL championships with the Staleys in 1921, the Canton Bulldogs in 1923 and the Cleveland Bulldogs in 1924. He played a total of 50 games in the NFL.

Notes

1895 births
1948 deaths
People from Carbondale, Illinois
Players of American football from Illinois
Canton Bulldogs players
Chicago Bears players
Chicago Staleys players
Cleveland Bulldogs players
Detroit Panthers players
Hammond Pros players
Milwaukee Badgers players
1958 deaths
Illinois Fighting Illini football players
Navy Midshipmen football players
Southern Illinois Salukis football players
Military personnel from Illinois